Indian Institute of Information Technology Una (IIIT, Una) is one of the Indian Institutes of Information Technology located at Vill. Saloh, Teh. Haroli, Distt. Una Himachal Pradesh-177209, Himachal Pradesh.. Established in 2014, it was recognized as an Institute of National Importance. IIIT Una is a joint venture of the Ministry of Human Resource Development, Government of India, the Govt. of Himachal Pradesh, with Industries in Public-Private Partnership model. The industries are H.P. Power Corporation and H.P. Power Transmission Corporation.

History
On 18 March 2013, Ministry of Human Resource Development, Government of India introduced a bill in the Parliament to establish 20 new Indian Institute of Information Technology's in different parts of the country. As per the bill, MHRD established 20 new IIITs under the Public-Private Partnership (PPP) mode partnering with respective state governments and industry partners.

IIITU started to intake students from the academic year 2014–15, offering Computer Science and Engineering and Electronics and Communication Engineering to the incoming students, functioning in the campus of NIT Hamirpur, with NIT Hamirpur acting as their mentor institute. At the start of the academic year 2017–18, Information Technology branch was also started in the institute.

On 9 August 2017, The Indian Institutes of Information Technology (Public-Private Partnership) Act, 2017 was passed, following which IIITU along with other newly established IIITs, was conferred the status of an Institute of National Importance. The bill, was passed, aiming to generate highly competent manpower of global standards for the Information Technology Industry, expected to act as a major catalyst to develop new knowledge in the field of Information Technology. On 3 October 2017, Prime Minister of India Narendra Modi laid the foundation stone of IIITU.

On 5 July 2018, Prof. Subramaniam Selvakumar was appointed by the MHRD as the full-time director of the institute, thus making IIITU not requiring any further mentoring from NIT Hamirpur. In March 2019, IIITU and IIT Ropar signed an MoU at Hamirpur, with an aim of developing the fraternity between IIITU and IIT Ropar. The MoU would allow IIITU to have access to various labs and advance research facilities and allow the institutes in joint research collaborative projects. Prof. Vinod Yadava, Director NIT Hamirpur also inaugurated the websites of the 10 student associations which included FORCE (CSE), Aavesh (ECE), Amogh (Magazine), etc. On 29 March 2019, IIITU held its first-ever convocation for the students of batch 2014–18, on the same day IIITU signed an MoU with IIT Mandi, through which Prof. Timothy A. Gonsalves, Director IIT Mandi, agreed in assisting IIITU in developing courses based practicum components of the IIT Mandi curriculum.

Before the academic year 2019–20, NIT Hamirpur expressed its inability in accommodating IIIT Una students in its campus, thus for want of hostel accommodation for the new incoming students, a need of a second campus was expressed by the administration. By the start of the academic year 2019–20, IIITU started its second temporary campus (TC-II) in Chandpur, Haroli, Una, where all the new incoming students were accommodated. At the same time the students of II, III and IV year had their classes conducted in the temporary campus in NIT Hamirpur (TC-I).

Now, IIIT Una is functioning from the permanent campus in the close proximity of Una city.

Admissions
The admission to IIIT is through JOSSA and Central Seat allocation Board (CSAB). The students are allotted admission by JOSSA based on their Joint Entrance Examination (JEE-Mains) ranks. The Indian Institute of Information Technology, Una is listed in the CSAB website under List of participating institutes. For Master of Technology (M. Tech) and Doctor of Philosophy (PhD) degrees you can apply at institute website.

Academic programs
The Institute presently offers B.Tech in Computer Science and Engineering (CSE), Electronics and Communication Engineering (ECE) and Information Technology(IT). IIIT Una offers postgraduate programs in the form of Master of Technology (M. Tech) and Doctor of Philosophy (PhD) degrees.

Campus status
IIIT UNA permanent campus is situated at Vill. Saloh, Teh. Haroli, Distt. Una Himachal Pradesh-177209.

References

External links

Una
Universities and colleges in Himachal Pradesh
Education in Una district
Educational institutions established in 2014
2014 establishments in Himachal Pradesh
Engineering colleges in Himachal Pradesh